Cors Fochno  is a raised peat bog near the village of Borth, in the county of Ceredigion, Wales. It was designated a  UNESCO (United Nations Educational, Scientific and Cultural Organization) biosphere reserve in 1976, and is the only such reserve in Wales.

A significant portion of the  former peatland complex was taken for agriculture; the surviving core area supports the largest expanse of primary near-natural raised bog in an estuarine context within the United Kingdom.

General site character

Bogs. Marshes. Water fringed vegetation. Fens (85%)
Heath. Scrub. Maquis and garrigue. (9%)
Humid grassland. Mesophile grassland (5%)
Improved grassland (1%)

Ecology
Part of the Dyfi National Nature Reserve, Cors Fochno contains several varieties of peat moss and carnivorous plant.

Wildlife

Otters, red kites, common buzzards, peregrines and hen harriers can be found here together with a number of Welsh Mountain Ponies, and adder, badger, blackcap, Dartford warbler, fallow deer, nightingale, nightjar, willow warbler, and woodcock. The site holds a population of rosy marsh moth, a very rare species in the UK.

In popular culture
Borth, Borth bog, and the Borth railway station form the backdrop to the main storyline in Season 1, Episode 4 ("The Girl in the Water") of Y Gwyll (Hinterland in English), transmitted on S4C in 2013 and BBC1 Wales in January 2014.
Cors Fochno, and Borth and its surroundings also form the backdrop to the young adult classic novel and Newbery Honor Book winner, A String in the Harp, 1976, by Nancy Bond.

Footnotes

External links

www.geograph.co.uk : photos of Cors Fochno and surrounding area
Cors Fochno Dig: bbc.co.uk/wales
Joint Nature Conservation Committee

Landforms of Ceredigion
Ceredigion
Bogs of Wales
Biosphere reserves of Wales
Nature reserves in Ceredigion
Ramsar sites in Wales
Borth